The Mayor of the City of Langley is the official head and chief executive officer of Langley, British Columbia. The mayor is elected for a four-year term. The 14th and current mayor is Nathan Pachal

The area of Langley City was previously part of the Township of Langley until it seceded to incorporate itself as a separate municipality in March 1955.

References

Langley City